The Moscow Zoo or Moskovsky Zoopark is a  zoo founded in 1864 by professor-biologists, K.F. Rulje, S.A. Usov and A.P. Bogdanov, from the Moscow State University. In 1919, the zoo was nationalized. In 1922, the ownership was transferred to the Government of Moscow and has remained under Moscow's control ever since.

The zoo had an area of  when it first opened, with 286 animals. The zoo's original buildings were wooden, built in the old Russian style with intricate wood trims.

In 1990, the zoo was renovated. Notable additions include a new main entrance in the shape of a large rock castle, and a footbridge that connected the old (1864) and new (1926) properties of the zoo. Prior to construction of the footbridge, the zoo operated as two 'separate zoos' because the Bolshaya Gruzinskaya Street divides the properties.

In addition, the zoo was expanded once more. New exhibits were opened including a sea aquarium, an aviary, a creatures of the night exhibit, a sea lion exhibit and a section aimed at children. Waterfalls and streams were added throughout to give the zoo a more natural feeling.

The zoo studies animal's behavior, feeding and reproduction, and breeds rare endangered species.

Moscow Zoo Museum  
Founded in 2008 in a two-storey building of the 19th century, built in the late XIX - early XX centuries, located on the territory of the zoo. Since 2015, the museum has been open to the public and everyone. In the central and side halls there is an exposition devoted to the history of the Moscow Zoo and a natural science permanent exposition. The collection of the museum includes more than 10,000 zoo coat of arms from all over the world, hundreds of paintings, sculptures and drawings by the masters of Russian animalistics, such as Vasily Vatagin, Alexei Komarov, Vadim Trofimov, Andrei Marts and Alexei Tsvetkov.

Research & Educational Center  
The Moscow Zoo has her own educational institute and research center. In addition to full-training for zoo staff and teachers, there is a continuing education program for zoo and aquarium staff, veterinarians, teachers and volunteers, as well as courses in zoo psychology. Since the Moscow Zoo has been chairman of all zoos in Russia since the Soviet period, it is a national training center. This was founded in 2017 by the current director Svetlana Akulova and Björn Stenvers.

Animals & Exhibits

Old Territory exhibits

Flamingo Pond 

 Greater flamingo
 American flamingo

Giraffe House 

 Reticulated giraffe

Fauna of China 

 Giant panda

Bird World

Elephant Museum 

 Indian elephant
 Rock hyrax

New Territory exhibits

Animal Island 
Outdoors:

 Asiatic lion
 Asian black bear
 Kamchatka brown bear
 Golden jackal
 Tundra wolf
 Striped hyena
 Siberian tiger

Indoors (Exotarium):

Polar World 

 Polar bear

Tur Hill 

 East Caucasian tur

Animals of Africa 

 South African giraffe
 Grévy's zebra
 Common ostrich
 Slender-tailed meerkat
 Sable antelope
 Kirk's dik-dik
 Silver dik-dik

Former exhibits

Dolphinarium 
From 2001 to 2014, the  operated on the grounds of the zoo's old territory. The exhibit was dismantled following unsanitary conditions and improper husbandry procedures.
 Beluga whale
 Common bottlenose dolphin

Directors 
Directors of the zoo have included:
 Yakov Kalynovsky (1864-1867)
 Alexey Usov (1867-1873)
 Alexandr Maklakov (1878-1880)
 Vladimir Popov (1878-1881)
 laexandr Chelukanov (1881-1883)
 Valdimir Vagner (1883-1886)
 Nikolai Kulagin (1889-1894)
 Alexandr Walter (1894-1895)
 Nikolai Antuschevich (1895-1904)
 Vladislav Pogorzhelsky (1904-1917)
 Yury Belogolovy (1917-1919)
 Aleksandr Kots (1919-1924)
 Mikhail Zavadovsky (1924-1928)
 Sergey Novikov (1928-1932)
 Eugeny Klemeck (1932-1935)
 Lew Ovstrovsky (1935-1940)
 Trophym Burdelev (1940-1950)
 Sergey Butygin (1950-1951)
 Igor Sosnovsky (1951-1977)
  (1977-2013)

Notes

Sources
 Vera Chaplina True Stories from the Moscow Zoo (1970) Englewood Cliffs, New Jersey; Prentice-Hall, Inc. P. 152 (translated by Lila Pargment, Estel Titiev).
  (in Russian)

External links

photography Moscow Zoo 2010
Moscow Zoo on zooinstitutes.com
Moscow Zoo breeding nursery on zooinstitutes.com
Moscow Zoo Academy

1864 establishments in the Russian Empire
Zoos in Russia
Buildings and structures in Moscow
Tourist attractions in Moscow